Chelsea Football Club are an association football club based in Fulham, West London. Founded in 1905, they play in the Premier League. Below is a list of all the players who made between 25 and 99 appearances for the club.

Key
Appearances as a substitute are included. This feature of the game was introduced in the Football League at the start of the 1965–66 season.
Statistics are correct up to and including the match played on 7 March 2023. Where a player left the club permanently after this date, his statistics are updated to his date of leaving.

Players
Current players are bolded.

Notes

See also
List of Chelsea F.C. players
List of Chelsea F.C. players (1–24 appearances)

References

External links
 Chelsea player database at stamford-bridge.com

 
Arsenal
Players
Association football player non-biographical articles